Jaya Krishna Cuttaree, GCSK (June 22, 1941-19 December 2018) was a Mauritian politician.

Early life and education
The son of a tailor, Jayen Cuttaree grew up in Rose Hill, Mauritius. He  was the descendant of Indian immigrants who had landed in Mauritius in the 19th century when it was a British colony.

Cuttaree attended Royal College Curepipe in Mauritius. He was granted a scholarship which enabled him to travel to Scotland to study Forestry. He graduated with a BSc in Forestry from the University of Edinburgh. Subsequently he studied for a MSc and PhD in Plant Ecology from the University of Uppsala in Sweden. Many years later he also completed a law degree.

Jayen Cuttaree is the brother-in-law of Dev Virahsawmy, who made history by becoming the first MMM politician to be elected to the Legislative Assembly in 1970. Dev's father, Simadree, was a minister of the Labour Party who later defected to rival party MTD.

Political career

Cuttaree was a member of Constituency No. 19 (Stanley / Rose Hill) from 1982 to 2010. He was appointed Minister for the first time in 1982 following the legislative elections that year. He was appointed Minister of Labour. Cuttaree then served as Minister of Lands and Housing after the victory of the MSM-MMM alliance in the 1991 Legislative Assembly.

Following the 2000 general elections, he was appointed Minister of Industry and Trade. In 2005, Cuttaree was a candidate for the position of Director General of the WTO as a candidate of the African Union.

Publications
Cuttaree launched his book  on Thursday 8 December 2011 titled Behind The Purple Curtain: A Political Autobiography and was published by ELP Publications.

Controversies

In 2005, Gérard Tyack  revealed that he had given money to Cuttaree from the Air Mauritius secret fund, also known as the scandalous "Caisse Noire". The money was meant for the newspaper of the Mauritian Militant Movement (MMM), Le Nouveau Militant. During the cross examination of Tyack, he revealed that he had mentioned this transaction in his statement to the Economic Crime Office (ECO). 

Indira Manrakhan, the former director of ECO, explained how she received information about the suspicious transaction involving Jayen Cuttaree in the Air Mauritius secret fund scandal. She believed there were reasonable grounds for an investigation on Jayen Cuttaree. However, the MSM-MMM government intervened by closing down ECO which was subsequently replaced by a weakened Independent Commission Against Corruption (ICAC). 

At the time of its closure ECO was in the midst of other investigations involving Mauritian politicians who had performed dubious overseas bank transactions. Rama Valayden  also alleged during a press conference that Cuttaree had not paid the Maritim Hotel after his lavish birthday party which was celebrated on 24 June 2001. Cuttaree denied these allegations.

References

External links
 Bio from WTO site

1941 births
2018 deaths
Foreign Ministers of Mauritius
Members of the National Assembly (Mauritius)
Mauritian Hindus
Mauritian scientists
20th-century Mauritian lawyers
People from Plaines Wilhems District
Mauritian Militant Movement politicians
Grand Commanders of the Order of the Star and Key of the Indian Ocean
Mauritian politicians of Indian descent